Localsaver.com is an online marketplace for coupons and deals for businesses in a local area. The LocalSaver.com website is managed by SparkSMB which is owned by Sinclair Broadcasting Group.

Localsaver.com sources much of its coupons from the local small businesses and other affiliate partners.

Advertise with Local Saver for 100% free. Provide your business information for consumers to find and contact you, write your own coupons or choose from coupons that are recommended by Local Saver. On doing that, your coupons and business information will appear on Localsaver.com.

See also 
Valpak
Coupon Cabin
RetailMeNot

References

External links 
 

Online marketplaces of the United States
Companies based in Bellevue, Washington